The Water Tower Park is a park in Lingya District, Kaohsiung, Taiwan.

History
The water tower was constructed in the 1960s.

Architecture
The main entrance of the park is shown by the arch shaped entrance located at the north east corner. It features optical fiber strips connected to a glass mosaic map of Kaohsiung. The sidewalk features plantation and LED lights. The existing water piping is painted and transformed into installation art to accentuate the theme of the park.

Transportation
The park is accessible within walking distance south west of Cultural Center Station of Kaohsiung MRT.

See also
 List of parks in Taiwan

References

Lingya District
Parks in Kaohsiung
Water towers in Taiwan